Beatmania IIDX 23: Copula is the 23rd installment of the Beatmania IIDX series. The first location test was held at the Tokyo Lesiure Land #2 location in Akihabara, Japan from July 10 through 12th 2015. It was released on November 11, 2015. This is Last Beatmania Series made by Konami Digital Entertainment before Konami Amusement.

Gameplay 
For more information about the gameplay of Beatmania IIDX in general, please refer to Beatmania IIDX#Gameplay.

Beatmania IIDX tasks the player with performing songs through a controller consisting of seven key buttons and a scratchable turntable. Hitting the notes with strong timing increases the score and groove gauge bar, allowing the player to finish the stage. Failing to do so depletes the gauge until it is empty, abruptly ending the song.

Beatmania IIDX 23: Copula retains the core gameplay introduced in the first game in the series, and builds upon features added in subsequent versions. Notes fall from the top of a vertical track, and players are required to either press buttons or turn turntables as they reach the bottom. Copula introduces a number of new features and gameplay elements to this base, including a new "hell charge note", additional beginner note charts available in standard mode, an "Assisted Easy" difficulty mode, and various other adjustments and features.

Gameplay changes

Hell charge notes 

In Beatmania IIDX 17: Sirius, "charge notes" and "backspin scratch" notes were introduced, where the player has to hold a button or continuously spin the turntable for a specified amount of time. Traditionally, these charge notes were effectively treated as a note at the start and end, with the end note being automatically treated as missed if the note is not held. In Copula, a new type of charge note, the "hell charge note" was introduced, in which the Groove Gauge meter would continuously drop or increase during the extent of the charge note, depending on whether it was correctly held. Additionally, with hell charge notes it became possible to recover from failing to hold the note by pressing and holding after the correct start point.

Assisted Easy mode 

In addition to the Easy mode available in previous versions, which reduced the rate at which the Groove Tauge drops when notes are missed, Copula added a new "Assisted Easy mode", in which the rate at which the gauge drops is the same as in Easy mode, but the threshold for clearing a chart is reduced from 80% to 60%. Charts cleared in this manner are marked as being "assist cleared".

Class mode changes 

Class mode (段位認定モード) is a mode in which players select from a series of preselected 4-song courses (ranked by the difficulty level of the course). The difficulty level of the highest level course cleared is often used as an indicator of the overall strength of the player.

In Copula several changes were made to the Class mode system. First, options were added to play a Class mode course with notes mirrored (mirror mode), with the Groove Gauge dropping faster than normal (EX mode) or both. These options were previously available in Beatmania IIDX 22: Pendual, but Mirror mode was selected based on whether the current day was "present phase" or "future phase", and EX mode required payment to be made using Konami's Paseli electronic currency; in Copula both options are available through normal menus.

Additionally, Chūden (中伝), a new class rank was added in-between classes 10th Dan (十段) and Kaiden (皆伝), while Class mode courses for dual-side play were changed from having 3 tracks to 4 tracks and began on 7th Kyū (七級) instead of 5th Kyū (五級).

Changes to song selection menus 

Certain beginner charts which were previously only available in the "step-up" training mode are now available in other modes such as standard mode, under the "All Beginner" folder. Various other minor changes were made to the song select UI, including a rainbow indication for unlocked hidden tracks, and new sort options.

Unlocking Modes

Rainbow Tickets and Pulaco Tickets 

Rainbow Tickets is a Paseli-Purchasable Item (similar to Pendual's Time Hourglass) which was available on November 26, 2015. The effect of this ticket would temporarily unlock any locked songs in Pendual and Copula (with the exception of some songs), and the Leggendaria folder songs (which were otherwise only available in the Extra Stage in Paseli pay mode) for only one session of gameplay. Tickets also gave boosts to unlocks when used in any Unlocking events. Note that the Rainbow Tickets will not work on any past unlock event songs from tricoro and SPADA, as these songs are regularly unlocked. Rainbow Tickets have a validity of 60 days upon purchase. The tickets would all be sold out on October 19, 2016, and expired on October 26, 2016.

In an update on February 3, 2016, most of the unlocks from Pendual (excluding two Floor Infectikn songs, five songs from previous unlock events (which must be unlocked on Expert mode), and all 17 Leggendaria Charts) can be unlocked by purchasing the charts (either all-at-once, or individually) on the Pulaco Ticket store using Pulas (the in-game currency similar to Dellars and Fricos). The Pulaco tickets function the same way as unlocking using Angel Cards from tricoro and the Sunlight Holograms from Pendual.

Season Line 

Season Line is the Extra Stage system which debuted on November 19, 2015, in which players must clear the songs through the first three stages in the game to access the songs. Each of the Season Line songs is based on a seasonal theme. Unlike the past Extra Stage Systems, there are no specific song conditions in which players have to play for unlocking. The six Songs and their respective Season Lines were:

Dunkel Weihnachten: nightmare before oversleep (available from November 19, 2015)
冬尽く小江戸 (Fuyutsuku Koedo): 麗 ～うらら～(Urara) (available from January 14, 2016)
Spring Festival: La dolce primavera (available from March 17, 2016)
occasional rain: 紫陽花 -AZISAI-(Ajisai -AZISAI-) (available from May 12, 2016)
kilogramme de l'aventure: か・し・ま・し☆PUMP UP!(Ka・shi・ma・shi☆PUMP UP!) (available from August 10, 2016)
えきねこ (Ekineko): 駅猫のワルツ(Ekineko no Waltz) (available from September 15, 2016)

The play conditions for access are made easier every Thursday. On the first week, the player can only access the Normal Chart. The second week allowed the Hyper chart to be played, and finally, the Another Chart on the third week. The total levels accumulated in the first three stages based on difficulty would also be lowered each week up to the fifth week of appearance. In addition, selecting any of the Season Line songs make a distinctive select sound when played. The sixth week further simplifies the clearing condition, with the player getting an A grade instead of AA or higher.

Initially, Season Line songs do not have One More Extra stages, just like SPADA's Leggendaria and tricoro's Limit Burst Extra Stage System. In an update starting September 15, 2016, all six of the Season Line songs could be unlocked by playing the songs once during the Extra Stage (without using Assist, Easy Gauge, Random or Mirror modifiers), and the unlock must be done on one-player mode only (playing with a second player will prevent the song from being unlocked). A coloured emblem of the corresponding Season Line song would be displayed next to the difficulty level when it's unlocked. When the player obtains all six emblems, the player can play NZM as their One More Extra stage song under the corresponding difficulty unlocked for the six songs (a fixed set of modifiers would be automatically toggled, with the Ex-Hard gauge as enabled and Random/Mirror as disabled). The gauge used for this stage is specially designed to only decrease for missed notes and doesn't recover (a gauge identical to the beatmania's Expert Mode Gauge). If the player fails the song, the emblems will be confiscated and the player must collect them by playing all the six songs again, but the play became easier on subsequent attempts (such as using a simpler gauge (Hard, Default or Easy), and allow the gauge to recover (except in the third attempt)). Once the final boss is cleared regardless of the type of gauge used, NZM would be unlocked for regular play.

Kaitsū! Tokotoko Line 

The first major unlocking event for this game began on November 26, 2015 and ended on April 24, 2016. This unlocking event objective is to build a railway and their station facilities through five areas in order to unlock the songs. Building a railway requires Material Points, which can be obtained by playing songs in the game (the number of points varies in each game mode). Material Points can be boosted further depending on the partners selected, or fulfilling conditions (such as playing one song from each game version, using various items such as Rainbow Tickets, or playing certain songs in a single playthrough.)

Completing the railway in an area would be a given rank promotion and allowed players to select one of the songs for unlocking (the order of the song is not specified, songs may be selected in random order). The player can anytime revisit the area for further unlocks. Each area has one to three stations to build, building one of them (which is indicated by the Area Happiness Gauge) would earn Pulars. Building all of the stations in the same area would unlock the console-exclusive and Revived Songs (the unlocks are pre-determined). Finally, building all the 12 stations throughout five areas would also unlock Blue Spring Express and the player can proceed to the second part of the event.

The second part (which began on December 22, 2015) required players to build facilities in the same five areas and likewise, building facilities would require filling up the Development Happiness Gauge certain times in order to unlock them. Building one facility in an area would earn Pulars; building all the facilities in the area would also unlock songs. When the player completely built all 11 facilities in all five areas, the final song 真 地獄超特急 -HELL or HELL- would also be unlocked for regular play and the event is completed.

This event have a total of 16 songs (eight songs in each part) to unlock.

Expert Mode 

The Expert Mode in which players play four consecutive songs without stopping was initially absent in the game's release, but it was made available through an update on February 3, 2016. Similar to the past instalments, players are required to select a course of four songs and play them in order without emptying the gauge to clear the course. Most of the course features (such as Internet Ranking, Customised and Random Courses) from PENDUAL were retained, including the ability to unlock songs under the Secret Course Folder.

Likewise, in order to unlock the secret songs, players are to play the respective secret course a certain number of times. The progress is shown by a gauge at the end of the gameplay, and the increase rate would depend on their performance and the modifiers used in-game. Filling the gauge completely would then unlock the song (and the corresponding difficulty) for normal play, even though the song has been previously unlocked.

Currently, 13 songs (including eight new songs from Copula) are available for unlocking in this mode.

Mystery Line 

The second major unlocking event began on April 27, 2016. The event folder would appear between My Favourite and Level Difficulty Folders during the game's final/Extra Stage, with an on-screen alert for any new destinations available. Players may not exit the mode once the folder is opened, and switching play styles between Singles and Doubles will be temporary disabled.

The unlocking process is split into two parts. The first part is the ‘Mystery Line’ folder, each destination would be chosen at random and only one would be visited at a time. Players can also choose to redeem three Rainbow Tickets if they want to change the destination, but the player must explore the area once decided. Note that playing the song once regardless of the difficulty selected would be saved onto the second part.

The second part is the ‘Mystery Explore’ folder. A pool of songs for the song's corresponding theme (with all the difficulty levels ranging from levels 1 to 12) and their charts (all four difficulties including Beginner charts) would be selected at random. Playing a song fills up a portion of a pie chart-like gauge that would unlock the chart for normal playing, with a rate determined on the selected level and the clear type. Depending on the difficulty chosen for unlocking, more songs were required to be played and were also based on the areas being explored (Normal is the plains area, Hyper is the wild area and Another is the mystery area). Regardless of the outcome, each play would remove one star from the parking counter. When all the three stars were used up, the train would move on to a new destination the next time the player enters the folder, whether the chart has been unlocked or not.

Some destinations are also marked secret and would be priorly selected over normal destinations. To access these destinations, players must further satisfy certain song conditions during the first two stages in gameplay, with some charts needing to be unlocked in advance.

There are sixteen songs which have to be unlocked in this event.

Music 
Currently, there are 97 new songs, including 81 all-new songs, 3 returning songs with alternate Another charts, 2 returning songs with added Hell Charge Notes, 7 songs from console versions, and 3 revived songs. A total of 23 songs from previous games have been removed.

References

External links

2015 video games
Japan-exclusive video games
Video games developed in Japan
Arcade video games
Arcade-only video games
Beatmania games
Turntable video games
Multiplayer and single-player video games